The 2006 United States Senate election in Vermont was held November 7, 2006. Incumbent independent Senator Jim Jeffords decided to retire rather than seek reelection to a fourth term, and Bernie Sanders was elected to succeed him.

Sanders, who represented Vermont's at-large House district as an independent, won the Democratic primary, and then dropped out to run as an independent. Many Democratic politicians across the country endorsed him, and no Democrat was on the ballot. The state committee of the Vermont Democratic Party voted unanimously to endorse Sanders.

Sanders won the seat with 65% of the vote. His win marked the first Republican loss for this seat in 152 years, decisively ending the longest single-party Senate winning streak in history.

Democratic primary 
After Jeffords retired, there was brief speculation that DNC chair Howard Dean, a former governor and 2004 presidential candidate, would run for Senate. After Dean quickly issued a statement that he would not run, independent Representative Bernie Sanders became the subject of media attention, and ultimately entered and won the race.

Candidates

Declared
 Larry Drown, retired plumber and perennial candidate
 Peter D. Moss, retired chemical engineer
 Louis W. Thabault, former postal worker
 Bernie Sanders, U.S. Representative and Liberty Union nominee for U.S. Senate in 1972

Declined
Howard Dean, former Governor of Vermont, chair of the Democratic National Committee
Doug Racine, former Lieutenant Governor of Vermont

Results 
Sanders won the Democratic primary, but declined the nomination, leaving no Democratic nominee on the ballot. This victory ensured that no Democrat would appear on the general election ballot to split the vote with Sanders, an ally of the Democrats who had been supported by leaders in the Democratic Party.

Republican primary 
National Republicans pressured Lieutenant Governor Brian Dubie to enter the race, and he formed an exploratory committee to do so, but the committee raised little money and Dubie opted not to run. Governor Jim Douglas also declined to run.

Businessman Richard Tarrant announced his campaign in October 2005. Tarrant largely self-funded his campaign, and frequently denounced political partisanship.

Candidates 
Cris Ericson, perennial candidate and marijuana legalization activist
Greg Parke, retired U.S. Air Force lieutenant colonel and nominee for VT-AL in 2004
 Richard Tarrant, businessman

Declined
Jim Douglas, governor of Vermont
Brian Dubie, lieutenant governor of Vermont

Endorsements

Results

General election

Candidates 
 Peter Diamondstone (Liberty Union), socialist activist and perennial candidate
 Cris Ericson (Independent)
 Craig Hill (Green), electronics marketer
 Peter Moss (Independent)
 Bernie Sanders (Independent), U.S. Representative from VT-AL
 Richard Tarrant (Republican), businessman

Campaign 
In mid-August 2006, the campaign heated up considerably, with Tarrant fully engaged in heavy media advertising, most of which criticized Sanders's public stances. Tarrant ran several ads accusing Sanders of representing himself differently from his voting record in the House of Representatives, citing such examples as Sanders's votes against Amber Alert and against increased penalties for child pornography. Sanders responded with an ad stating that Tarrant's claims were "dishonest" and "distort my record", and presented what he viewed as more accurate explanations of his voting record. 

Tarrant also claimed that Sanders's election would lead to an exodus of businesses from Vermont. Sanders based his campaign on a well-tested message of fixing economic inequality, and ran a positive campaign that took advantage of his high name recognition in the state.

Endorsements

Fund-raising 
The election was the most expensive political campaign in Vermont history.

Tarrant was a self-funded candidate, with 98% of all his campaign expenditures coming from personal sources. He spent $7,315,854 total. Sanders' top contributors include the plaintiffs' law firm Baron & Budd; the International Union of Operating Engineers; the Laborers' International Union of North America; and the Communication Workers of America. Sanders raised $5,554,466 total. In total, Tarrant and Sanders spent $13,771,060. Tarrant spent $85 per vote, the largest cost per vote of any race in the country during 2006, while Sanders spent $34 per vote.

Debates

Polling

Results 
Official results from the Vermont United States Senate.

Sanders won a majority of the votes in every county in the state, with 57% as his lowest county total. He has served as a U.S. Senator for Vermont ever since.

See also 
 2006 United States Senate elections

References

External links 
 Vermont Secretary of State's Draft list of candidates (Excel spreadsheet). (Final version due to be released on July 24, 2006).
 2006 Vermont Senate Debate on C-SPAN

Official campaign websites (Archived)
Bernie Sanders
Richard Tarrant

2006
2006 Vermont elections
Vermont
Bernie Sanders